AMPC may refer to:
A More Perfect Constitution
Amoxicillin, by trade name AMPC
The Royal Pioneer Corps, part of the British Army previously called the Auxiliary Military Pioneer Corps
The classic edition of the Amplified Bible